Checkers is a 1919 American silent melodrama film, directed by Richard Stanton. There are no known archival holdings of the film, so it is presumably a lost film. The film is based on the screenplay with the same name by Henry Blossom. Mazie LaShelle Hunt and Marjorie Seely Blossom, the widows of Kirke La Shelle and Henry Blossom respectively, filed a lawsuit in the Supreme Court against Fox Film regarding the sale of the film.

Cast list
 Thomas Carrigan as Checkers
 Jean Acker as Pert Barlow
 Ellen Cassidy  as Alva Romaine
 Robert Elliott as Arthur Kendall
 Tammany Young as Push Miller
 Bertram Marburgh as Judge Barlow
 Edward Sedgwick as Pete
 Peggy Worth as Sadie Martin
 Frank Beamish as Colonel Warren
 Freeman Barnes as Sam Wah
 Gene Bucus as Chinese girl
 Juliet Crane as A girl of the slums
 Anna Neilson as Hag
 Dorothy Orth as Ballet dancer

Reception
The Film Daily gave it a positive review in July 1920, stating that it as a whole was a "Good, old-fashioned racing meller that contained thrills a-plenty, heart interest, and all the other elements that should make it go ver big; well-acted and well-produced.".
Photoplay also gave it a positive review, writing that it "[...] has a speed that never lets down, an electric sort of thrill in its most exciting episodes, and its heroics are of the style that recall those days when we shuffled our feet among the peanut-shells on the gallery floor and nearly fell over the rail whenever the heroine was in peril."

By october 1919, the film had been seen by over 1,540,000 people, and had been shown 700 times in New York alone.

References

External links 
 
 
 lobby poster

American silent feature films
American black-and-white films